The Milwaukee Public Museum (MPM) is a natural and human history museum in downtown Milwaukee, Wisconsin. The museum was chartered in 1882 and opened to the public in 1884; it is a not-for-profit organization operated by the Milwaukee Public Museum, Inc.  MPM has three floors of exhibits and the first Dome Theater in Wisconsin.

History

The German-English Academy 
MPM was one of several major American museums established in the late 19th century. Although it was officially chartered in 1882, its existence can be traced back to 1851, to the founding of the German-English Academy in Milwaukee. The academy's principal, Peter Engelmann, encouraged student field trips, many of which collected various specimens—organic, geological, and archaeological in nature—which were kept at the academy. Later, alumni and others donated specimens of historical and ethnological interest to the collection.

By 1857, interest in the academy's collection had grown to such an extent that Engelmann organized a natural history society to manage and expand the collection. Eventually, the collection, which had come to be informally called "The Museum", exceeded the academy's ability to accommodate it. August Stirn, a city alderman and member of the national history society, obtained legislation from the state legislature for the City of Milwaukee to accept the collection and take the measures to establish "a free public museum".

Early years 

The newly formed Board of Trustees hired Carl Doerflinger to be the museum's first director and rented space to place exhibits. The Milwaukee Public Museum opened to the public on May 24, 1884. Doerflinger placed emphasis on using MPM's exhibits for study and research as well as for public education, until he resigned in 1888. He also urged the city to purchase land on which a building could be constructed to house the museum and the Milwaukee Public Library; the new building (at 814 W. Wisconsin Avenue) was completed in 1898.

In 1890, Carl Akeley, a taxidermist and biologist noted as the "father of modern taxidermy" completed the first complete museum habitat diorama in the world, depicting a muskrat colony.

Henry L. Ward was hired as MPM's fourth director in 1902; previously, the museum had focused solely on the natural sciences: this changed when Ward began the creation of a History Museum. To further this goal, Samuel A. Barrett, the recipient of the first doctorate in anthropology awarded by the University of California, was selected to head an anthropology-history department.

Barrett later succeeded Ward and led the museum through the Great Depression of the 1930s. Barrett used the Works Progress Administration and other New Deal programs to keep the museum running and to create employment beyond the previous basic staff.

Modern history 
Construction on MPM's current building began in 1960 and was completed in 1962. The current site is at 800 W. Wells Street, a block north of the old Museum-Library building, still the home of the Milwaukee Central Library, which continued to house exhibits until 1966.

A controversy over the imposition of admittance fees on visitors who were not residents of the City of Milwaukee led to the museum being sold by the city to Milwaukee County in 1976. In 1992, amid assertions that the museum was on the verge of bankruptcy and might have to be sold or completely privatized, a compromise was reached in which the county retained the museum's nominal ownership but all operating control was handed over to Milwaukee Public Museum, Inc., a not-for-profit controlled by local business interests such as Miller Brewing. Employee wages and benefits were slashed, but private donations expanded and the county's share of costs was diminished.

In 2006, charges were filed against former museum chief financial officer Terry Gaouette, following the revelation that the museum was several million dollars in the red, a fact that allegedly had been hidden for years by illegal money transfers. Gaouette pleaded guilty to one misdemeanor charge of falsifying a financial report, and his CPA license was restored in 2010.

In 2010, the Milwaukee Public Museum appointed a new director Jay B. Williams, formerly of PrivateBank. He has focused on fundraising and improving repeat traffic.

In 2014, MPM hired Dennis Kois as president and CEO. Kois resigned from the museum in 2018 for personal reasons, following the museum board's investigation of an alleged affair between Kois and a staff member. Ellen Censky has been named the interim president and CEO while the MPM Board of Directors undertakes a nationwide search for the position.

At the conclusion of the search in June 2019, Dr. Ellen Censky was officially named president and CEO

Future 
On September 11, 2020, the museum announced plans to build a new building along N. Sixth St, between W. McKinley Ave and W. Vliet St. on a site 1 block north of Fiserv Forum, where the Milwaukee Bucks play. According to a study undertaken by the museum, it revealed that the museum was in need of $30 million in maintenance work. Although design work was only in the earliest stages at the time of the announcement; it is estimated that the new building will only feature just over half the exhibit space as the current facility. Currently, it is estimated that the new building will open sometime in 2026. Due to the greatly reduced size of the future museum, MPM will seek a second site to store around 4 million artifacts that will not be able to be displayed.

Exhibits 
The Milwaukee Public Museum houses permanent and traveling exhibits.

Permanent exhibits 

The first major exhibit in the current museum to be completed was "Streets of Old Milwaukee", which opened in January 1965. It is one of the more popular exhibits in MPM, and it is estimated that several million people have visited it since its completion.

Research and collections 

Totaling more than 4 million artifacts, research and collections at the Milwaukee Public Museum include 
a 14,500-year-old woolly mammoth skeleton donated to the museum. The real bones are too fragile and are preserved for research, but a fiberglass replica set is on display at the museum.
 a collection of thousands of bird eggs, which is currently being digitally archived

Footnotes

References

External links 

Official website
 

Museums established in 1882
Museums in Milwaukee
History museums in Wisconsin
Natural history museums in Wisconsin
Native American museums in Wisconsin
Works Progress Administration in Wisconsin
Dinosaur museums in the United States
Downtown Milwaukee